Putrefactive Infestation is the first EP by French death metal band Necrowretch. It was co-released on July 8, 2011, by Detest Records and Me Saco Un Ojo Records on 12" vinyl format, either as plain black or a white wax edition both limited to 500 copies.
Tracks from this EP were re-released on the "Bestial Rites" Compilation.

Track listing

Personnel
Necrowretch
 Vlad – Vocals, Guitar
 Amphycion – Bass
 Blastphemator – Drums

Miscellaneous staff
 Milovan Novaković – artwork

References

2011 EPs
Necrowretch EPs